Phyllonorycter emberizaepenella is a moth of the family Gracillariidae. It is found in all of Europe, except the Iberian Peninsula and the Balkan Peninsula. 

The wingspan is 9–10 mm. The forewings are shining golden-ochreous; a short whitish median streak from base; a fascia at 1/4, another at 1/2, two posterior costal and three dorsal wedge-shaped spots shining whitish, anteriorly blackish-margined; some blackish scales in disc between spots and towards apex. Hindwings are grey. The larva is green - whitish; dorsal line darker green; head pale greenish. 

There are two generations per year with adults on wing in May and again in August.

The larvae feed on Lonicera alpigena, Lonicera × bella, Lonicera caerulea, Lonicera deflexicalyx, Lonicera flava, Lonicera gracilipes, Lonicera ledebourii, Lonicera maackii, Lonicera morrowii, Lonicera nigra, Lonicera orientalis, Lonicera periclymenum, Lonicera prostrata, Lonicera rupicola, Lonicera tatarica, Lonicera webbiana, Lonicera xylosteum and Symphoricarpos albus. They mine the leaves of their host plant. They create a lower-surface, white, inflated tentiform mine, that may occupy the entire leaf. The mine causes the leaf to roll lengthwise. The pupa is made in a papery cocoon.

References

External links

Craves, J.A. (2017) Native birds exploit leaf-mining moth larvae using a new North American host, non-native Lonicera maackii, Écoscience, 24:3-4, 81-90, DOI: 10.1080/11956860.2017.1367908

emberizaepenella
Moths of Europe
Taxa named by Peter Friedrich Bouché
Moths described in 1834